The Chief Justice of New South Wales is the senior judge of the Supreme Court of New South Wales and the highest-ranking judicial officer in the Australian state of New South Wales. The Chief Justice is both the judicial head of the Supreme Court as well as the administrative head, responsible for arranging the business of the court and establishing its rules and procedures.

The current Chief Justice is Andrew Bell who was appointed by Governor Margaret Beazley.

List of chief justices of New South Wales

See also
 Judiciary of Australia

References

 
Lists of judges of Australian superior courts